Razor Burn is the seventh studio album by South African gothic rock band The Awakening, released on Massacre Records in Germany and Intervention Arts in Africa and the US in September 2006.

Recording
Marketed as a "blend of pounding metal guitars and traditional gothic rock," the album features dark, moody industrial elements mixed with mid-tempo rock song structures.  With the European distribution and marketing of Massacre Records it received additional media attention, wider distribution and positive reviews from alternative music press.

Track listing

"Outside the Asylum" 
"Arrow" 
"Heaven Waits" 
"The Neon Sky" 
"Razor Burn" 
"Darkness Calls (Razor Burn part 2)"
"Bleeding" 
"Descent" 
"Oblivion" 
"Halo"
"Below"
"Asylum"

References

The Awakening (band) albums
2006 albums